Bava is a Sri Lankan name for god.  There is a belief that parents who give this name to a son or daughter will be enriched with good fortune in terms of money and gold. This may be related to the early presence  of Syriac Speaking Christians in Sri Lanca, as described by Cosmas Indicopleaustes in the 6th century. The Syriac word Bava is used to address the God-Holy Father and also the head of the Church- the Catholicose or Patriarch.

In the Syriac Christian traditions the Catholicoses and Patriarchs are addressed as Bava. It is the Syriac equivalent of the Latin/Greek title Pope. Both words literally translate to 'Fath

It is also use in one south side state Karnataka in India. The Sister's husband is called Bava. The Father's sister's son or mothers brothers son are called Bava. Girls address them as Bava. They can get married with each other. 

Names of God